Khampa may refer to:

Natives of Kham, a historical region of Tibet
Khampa language
Jad people, of Himachal Pradesh and Uttarakhand, India
Khampa, Russia, a selo in Vilyuysky District, Sakha Republic
Seuth Khampa (born 1962), Laotian Olympic sprinter

See also
 Kampa (disambiguation)

Language and nationality disambiguation pages